This is a list of the busiest railway stations in Switzerland, loosely based on statistics and data received on the year of 2014. In this list, all stations can be considered as major stations or hubs, as well as stations serving major cities, large towns, or in some occasions, airports. Most of the stations listed below serve many long-distance services, with the busiest of them even serving international train services.

References

External links
 Daily ridership of Swiss railway stations, 2014 data

Stations
Railway stations in Switzerland
Rail transport-related lists of superlatives